Belathur  is a locality in the eastern part of Bangalore.

References

External links

Bangalore
Karnataka